Guinea (Guinée, in French) or Guinea-Conakry is a republic in West Africa, independent since 1958.

Guinea may also refer to:

Places

West Africa

Nations
 Equatorial Guinea, a country in Central Africa, formerly the colony of Spanish Guinea
 Guinea-Bissau, a country in West Africa, formerly the colony of Portuguese Guinea

Regions
 Guinea (region), a region in West Africa
 Guinea Highlands, a forested mountain plateau in the Guinea region
 Guinean forest-savanna mosaic, an ecoregion of West Africa
 Upper Guinean forests, a tropical moist forest region of West Africa
 Middle Guinea, a region in the central part of the Republic of Guinea
 Lower Guinean forests, a coastal forest region in the Guinea region
 Gulf of Guinea, a gulf of the Atlantic Ocean off West African coast, south of Nigeria and west of Cameroon
 Upper Guinea historical name for the north coast of the gulf
 Lower Guinea, a historical name for the east coast of the gulf

Historical
 Danish Guinea, another name for Danish Gold Coast, a former colony in what is now Ghana, West Africa
 French Guinea, a former colony in West Africa, what is now Guinea
 Portuguese Guinea, a former colony in West Africa, what is now Guinea-Bissau
 Spanish Guinea, a former colony in West Africa, what is now Equatorial Guinea
 Swedish Guinea, another name for Swedish Gold Coast, a former colony in what is now Ghana, West Africa

Oceania
 New Guinea (Papua Island), a large island in Oceania in the southwestern Pacific
 Papua New Guinea, a nation occupying the eastern half of the island of New Guinea and adjacent islands
 British Guinea, or British New Guinea, another name for the Territory of Papua, a former colony in what is now Papua New Guinea
 German New Guinea, a former colony in what is now Papua New Guinea
 Western New Guinea, the western half of New Guinea which forms a part of Indonesia
 West Papua (province), Indonesian province formed in early 2000's
 Papua (province), Indonesian province formed in early 2000's
 Netherlands New Guinea, also known as the Dutch New Guinea, a former Dutch colony in what is now Indonesian Papua
 Republic of West Papua, proposed state
 Irian Jaya, Indonesian province formed in 1969 following the West New Guinea dispute
 Papua (disambiguation)

Places in North America
 Guinea, Nova Scotia a community in Nova Scotia, Canada
 Guinea, a region of Gloucester County, Virginia, United States
 Guinea, Virginia, an unincorporated community in Caroline County, Virginia
 Nueva Guinea, a town in Nicaragua

Currency
 Guinea (coin), a former British coin and currency unit
 Egyptian pound (Egyptian Arabic ), genēh is pronounced like the English word guinea

Surname
 Cristina Guinea (born 1992), field hockey midfielder
 Emilio Guinea (1907–1985), Spanish botanist

Animals
 Guinea (wasp), a wasp genus in the subfamily Pteromalinae
 Guinea baboon, Papio papio, a species of baboon
 Guinea pig, a genus of rodents
 Guinea snout-burrower, a species of frog
 Guinea worm, parasitic worm native to parts of Africa
 Guineafowl, four genera of chicken-like birds in the family Numididae

Other uses
 Aikea-Guinea, 1985 single by the Cocteau Twins
 "Guinea", an English-language offensive term for someone of Italian descent
 "Guineas", a former term (now considered pejorative) for the Chestnut Ridge people of West Virginia
 The 1000 Guineas or 2000 Guineas British horse races run at Newmarket

See also
 Guinia (disambiguation)
 Akal n-Iguinawen, for the possible origin of the name Guinea
 Areas in South America with similar spellings:
 French Guiana, an overseas department of France
 Guyana, a country
 The Guianas, a region
 Guinea Creole (disambiguation)
 Guinea company (disambiguation)
 Guinn
 Guyana (disambiguation)
Guineaman, a ship used to transport slaves from the region of Guinea